Sarah Berglind (born February 10, 1996) is a Swedish ice hockey goaltender who played for Modo Hockey and the Swedish national team.

Career 
Berglind made her SDHL debut at the age of 16 with Modo in 2012. She would then play another 5 seasons with the club. In 2018, she announced she was leaving hockey after her brother died in a workplace accident.

International  
She participated at the 2017 IIHF Women's World Championship. She would then play two games for Sweden at the 2018 Winter Olympics.

References

External links

1996 births
Living people
Swedish women's ice hockey goaltenders
People from Östersund
Olympic ice hockey players of Sweden
Ice hockey players at the 2018 Winter Olympics
Sportspeople from Jämtland County